Somerset Airport may refer to:

 Somerset Airport (New Jersey) in Somerset County, New Jersey, United States (FAA: SMQ)
 Somerset Aerodrome in Somerset, Manitoba, Canada (TC: CKC8)
 Somerset County Airport in Somerset County, Pennsylvania, United States (FAA: 2G9)

See also
Transport in Somerset